Sag Harbor Village District is a national historic district in Sag Harbor, Suffolk County, New York. It comprises the entire business district of the village.  It includes 870 contributing buildings, seven contributing sites, two contributing structures, and three contributing objects. It includes the First Presbyterian Church, a National Historic Landmark building designed by Minard Lafever.

The district was listed on the National Register of Historic Places in 1973 and its boundaries were increased in 1994.

See also

Sag Harbor Hills, Azurest, and Ninevah Beach Subdivisions Historic District

References

External links

Sag Harbor Village Historic District Map

Historic districts on the National Register of Historic Places in New York (state)
Sag Harbor, New York
Historic districts in Suffolk County, New York
National Register of Historic Places in Suffolk County, New York